The Bangladesh Red Crescent Society (also abbreviated as BDRCS) is a humanitarian organization and auxiliary to the Government of Bangladesh. The organization was established in 1973 as the Bangladesh Red Cross Society through the Presidents Order 26. It changed its name to Bangladesh Red Crescent Society in 1988 while the country adopted Islam as the constitutional religion. It has its headquarters in Dhaka and also has 68 Units. A Unit is constituted in each of the 64 districts and in the Metropolitan cities of Dhaka. Chittagong, Rajshahi & Khulna. The society has played an instrumental role in relief and rehabilitation during floods, cyclones and other natural disasters which are frequent in various parts of Bangladesh They are also one of the largest sources of blood donation throughout the country.

Organizational structure
The President of the People’s Republic of Bangladesh is the Head of the Bangladesh Red Crescent Society by designation. Under his supervision, a Managing Board runs the organization.

Management
The Managing Board consists of 15 members. There is a Chairman, a Vice-Chairman, a Treasurer and 12 general members on the board. As of June 2022, the current postholders are:
Chairman: Major General A. T. M. Abdul Wahab (Retd)
Vice-Chairman: Md. Nur-Ur-Rahman
Treasurer: Mohammad Abdus Salam

Under the Managing Board, there are 2 Divisional Chiefs and 19 Directors responsible for each of the departments that run the organization. This senior management is presided over by a Secretary General and a Deputy Secretary General. The current Secretary General of BDRCS is Kazi Shafiqul Azam and the current Deputy Secretary General is Md. Rafiqul Islam.

Gallery

See also
 List of Red Cross and Red Crescent Societies
 International Red Cross and Red Crescent Movement
 International Federation of Red Cross and Red Crescent Societies
 Emblems of the International Red Cross and Red Crescent Movement

References

External links
Red Crescent Society Profile
Red Cross Web Site
Bangladesh Red Crescent Society Website

Red Cross and Red Crescent national societies
Organizations established in 1973
Medical and health organisations based in Bangladesh
1973 establishments in Bangladesh